The Potez 43 was a family of French light utility and sports aircraft, developed in early 1930s. They were three-seat single-engine high-wing monoplanes.

Design and development 
The plane was a development of Potez 36. First of all it featured new, slimmer fuselage, with three seats, instead of two. A disadvantage were non-folding wings, with shorter slats. The original Potez 430 first flew in June 1932, powered by a  Potez 6Ас radial engine. 25 examples of this variant were completed, followed by other variants, differing with the last digit in designation. Other variants built in significant numbers were Potez 431 and Potez 438. 161 of Potez 43 family were built in total.

Operational service
Two Potez 430s (registrations: F-AMBM and F-AMBN) took part in the Challenge 1932 international tourist plane contest. Pierre Duroyon took the 22nd place (for 43 starting and 24 finishing crews), while Georges Detre was disqualified due to low cruise speed.

Variants
Potez 430
First version,  Potez 6Ас engine, 25 built.
Potez 431
Modified series version of 1933, Potez 6Ас engine, 60 built.
Potez 432
Version with  Renault 4Pei engine, 3 built (first flew 21 April 1933).
Potez 434
Version with  de Havilland Gipsy Major I straight engine, 9 built (first flew 2 November 1933).
Potez 435
Version with  Renault 4Pdi engine, 11 built (first flew 23 June 1933).
Potez 436
Potez 437
Modified version with  Renault 4Pdi engine, 9 built (first flew 17 July 1934).
Potez 438
Military trainer and liaison version with  Renault 4Pdi engine and a tail wheel, of 1934. 40 built (according to other sources, 33).
Potez 439

Operators

French Air Force

Specifications (Potez 430)

Mixed construction strutted high-wing monoplane. A steel framed fuselage covered with canvas. Rectangular two-spar wing, with rounded ends, of wooden construction, canvas covered. Wings were equipped with slats on 1/3 span and supported with main V-shaped struts. Closed cabin with three seats, well glazed. Engine in front, two-blade propeller. Conventional fixed landing gear, with a rear skid, wheels in teardrop covers.

See also

References

Bibliography

Further reading

External links

Photos and drawing at Ugolok Neba page

1930s French civil utility aircraft
043
High-wing aircraft
Single-engined tractor aircraft
Aircraft first flown in 1932